Chris Gibson-Smith  (born September 1945) is a British businessman who was chairman of the London Stock Exchange Group from 2003 to 2015.

Education 

Gibson-Smith studied at Durham University (University College), where he completed a BSc in Geology in 1967. He gained a PhD in Geochemistry from Newcastle University in 1970 and has also spent time at Stanford Business School.

Career 

A geologist by training, Gibson-Smith spent over 30 Years at BP, latterly as one of five group managing directors reporting to then CEO, Lord Browne.

During his time at the London Stock Exchange, Gibson-Smith oversaw a number of hostile bid defences, and the subsequent acquisitions of Italian stock exchange Borsa Italiana, FTSE International, LCH.Clearnet and Frank Russell Investments.

Since leaving the London Stock Exchange, Gibson-Smith has become an adviser to Swiss investment bank, UBS. He was succeeded as chairman of London Stock Exchange Group by Donald Brydon.

Gibson-Smith is also chairman of retirement specialist, Just Group plc. He also chaired National Air Traffic Services (Nats) from 2001 to 2005, and British Land from 2007 to 2012.

References

Living people
1945 births
London Stock Exchange people
BP people
Alumni of University College, Durham
Alumni of Newcastle University
Stanford University alumni
British Land people